Jerry Petrowski (born June 16, 1950) is an American politician and a former ginseng, dairy and beef farmer. He is a Republican member of the Wisconsin State Senate, representing the 29th Senate District since 2012, and a former State Representative, representing the 86th Assembly District from 1999 to 2012.

Background 
Petrowski was born on June 16, 1950 in Wausau, Wisconsin. He graduated from Newman High School before attending the University of Wisconsin–Marathon County and Northcentral Technical College, all in Wausau. Petrowski served in the United States Army Reserve for six years after high school. Following his service, he worked as a machinist and became a small business owner and ginseng, dairy, and beef farmer. Petrowski has been a lifelong resident of the 29th Senate District.

Public office 
Petrowski represented the 86th Assembly District in the Wisconsin State Assembly from 1999 to 2012. From 2003 to 2007 he served as the Majority Caucus Sergeant at Arms in the State Assembly.

Petrowski was a candidate in the recall election to replace fellow Republican State Senator Pam Galloway of the 29th Senate District, who had resigned after being targeted for recall. On June 5, 2012, Petrowski was elected to the Wisconsin State Senate, defeating Representative Donna Seidel with 61.34% of the vote.

Petrowski is the Chair of the Senate Transportation, Public Safety and Veterans and Military Affairs Committee, Vice Chair of the Senate Economic Development and Local Government Committee, and is a voting member of the Senate Agriculture, Small Business, and Tourism Committee, the Senate Financial Institutions and Rural Issues Committee, and the Joint Legislative Council. Petrowski also serves on the Governor’s Council on Highway Safety, Transportation Projects Commission, Rustic Roads Board, Scenic Byway Advisory Committee, Council on Military and State Relations, the State Council on Interstate Compact on Educational Opportunity for Military Children and the University of Wisconsin–Stevens Point College of Natural Resources Advisory Board.

Personal life 
Petrowski and his wife, Ellen, have four children and three grandchildren.

References

External links 
Official website

1950 births
Farmers from Wisconsin
Living people
Republican Party Wisconsin state senators
Republican Party members of the Wisconsin State Assembly
Politicians from Wausau, Wisconsin
21st-century American politicians
People from Marathon, Wisconsin